Sallie Holman (June 24, 1849 – June 7, 1888) was a Canadian opera singer.

Born in Lynn, Massachusetts, she was the daughter of George W. Holman and Harriet Phillips, and was the principal singer in an English opera troupe, the Holman English Opera Troupe, formed by her father in the 1860s composed of her father, mother, and her siblings. The company toured the eastern United States and Canada from the late 1850s to the early 1880s. She married Mr. J.T. Dalton, a member of the company, in 1879.

She died on June 7, 1888.

References

External links
 

1849 births
1888 deaths
19th-century Canadian women opera singers
Canadian operatic sopranos
People from Lynn, Massachusetts